Alaa Ahmed Seif Abd-El Fattah (born 18 November 1981), known professionally as Alaa Abd El-Fattah, is an Egyptian-British blogger, software developer and a political activist. He has been active in developing Arabic-language versions of software and platforms. He was imprisoned in Egypt for allegedly organising a political protest without requesting authorization, though he was released on bail on 23 March 2014. He was rearrested and ordered released on bail again on 15 September 2014, subsequently sentenced to a month of jail in absentia, and received a five-year sentence in February 2015, which he was released from in late March 2019. Abd El-Fattah remained subject to a five-year parole period, requiring him to stay at a police station for 12 hours daily, from evening until morning. On 29 September, during the 2019 Egyptian protests, Abd El-Fattah was arrested by the National Security Agency and taken to State Security Prosecution on charges that were unknown . He was subsequently convicted of "spreading fake news" and jailed for five years. In April 2022 he began a hunger strike.

Background
Abd El-Fattah was born on 18 November 1981 in Cairo, Egypt. He was raised in a family of well-known Egyptian activists. His father, Ahmed Seif El-Islam Hamad, a human rights attorney who had been arrested in 1983 by State Security Investigations Service officers and tortured and imprisoned for five years, is one of the founders of the Hisham Mubarak Law Center. His mother Laila Soueif, the sister of the novelist and political commentator Ahdaf Soueif, is a professor of mathematics at Cairo University and a political activist. His parents' activism began in the Anwar Sadat era. During a demonstration in 2005, his mother and other women, were attacked by Mubarak supporters; Abd El-Fattah was said to have protected her. One of his sisters is Mona Seif, a founding member of 'No Military Trials for Civilians', a group raising awareness for the civilian detainees summoned by military prosecutors and investigating torture allegations involving military police. His other sister, Sanaa Seif, is an activist and film editor who co-founded a newspaper about the Arab spring called 'Gornal'.

Political activism and arrests

Abd El-Fattah co-founded with his wife Manal Bahey El-Din Hassan (daughter of activist Bahi El-Din Hassan), the Egyptian blog aggregator Manalaa and Omraneya, the first Arab blog aggregators that did not restrict inclusion based on the content of the blog. In 2005, the Manalaa blog won the Special Reporters Without Borders Award in Deutsche Welle's Best of Blogs competition. He has supported initiatives that promote citizen journalism on social media and has more than 600,000 people following his personal Twitter and Facebook accounts.

Abd El-Fattah has been questioned, arrested and detained on several occasions. He was arrested on 7 May 2006 when demonstrating for independent judiciary and released on 20 June 2006. On 30 October 2011, he was arrested for inciting violence at the 9 October Maspero clashes and released on 25 December 2011. On 26 March 2013, he was arrested for inciting aggression during a protest outside Muslim Brotherhood's headquarters, known as the Mokattam Clashes of March 2013 but was later acquitted on all charges. Two days later, on 28 March 2013, he was arrested and charged for torching former presidential candidate Ahmed Shafik’s campaign headquarters on 28 May 2012, and received a suspended 1-year jail term. On 28 November 2013, he was arrested for rallying, inciting violence, resisting authorities and violating the Anti-protest Law after a demonstration against military trials for civilians outside Shura Council building on 26 November 2013. He was initially released on 23 March 2014, after 115 days in detention. In June 2014, he was sentenced in absentia to 15 years in prison and detained again awaiting his retrial, during which time he went on a hunger strike. In his retrial on 15 September 2014, he was released on bail.

In 2021, an anthology of his writing—some smuggled out from his jail cell—translated into English by anonymous supporters, was published, under the title You Have Not Yet Been Defeated. It has a foreword by Naomi Klein.

In July, 2022, an Arabic translation of the book was published by Jusur, a Lebanese publishing house based in Beirut, under the title Shabah' Al-Rabea'.

During his two-month detention in 2011, his son Khaled was born and during his three-month detention in 2014, his father Ahmed Seif El-Islam Hamad died.

May 2006 arrest and reaction 

On 7 May 2006, Abd El-Fattah was arrested during a peaceful protest after he called for an independent judiciary. His arrest, along with that of several other bloggers and activists, spurred solidarity protests by others around the world, some of whom created the blog "Free Alaa" devoted to calling for his release from jail.
Abd El-Fattah was released on 20 June 2006, after spending 45 days in jail. His wife Manal was quoted by the London Independent as saying: "There's no going back now, we'll definitely be continuing our activities."

2011 revolution

According to Egyptian newspaper al-Ahram Weekly, Abd el-Fattah's name "is in many ways synonymous with Egypt's 25 January Revolution." Abd El-Fattah participated in nearly every demonstration after the revolution began. He was not in Egypt on 25 January 2011, when the anti-regime protests began and when the Egyptian government shut down the internet in the country. However, he was able to collect information from family and friends by land-line phones and published to the outside world the events occurring in Egypt during the first days of the revolution. A few days later, he returned to Egypt and was in Tahrir Square, the epicenter of the protests, on 2 February. While demonstrating there, he participated in defending the square from attacks by security forces and pro-regime assailants, an event known in Egypt as "camel battle."

Abd El-Fattah continued his participation in the Egyptian revolution, until Mubarak stepped down from presidency. He thereafter settled in Egypt, where he maintained his participation in the demonstrations against the Supreme Council of the Armed Forces' (SCAF) way of running the country after Mubarak's fall.

October 2011 arrest
On 30 October, Abd El-Fattah was arrested on charges of inciting violence against the military during the 9 October Maspero demonstrations, during which hundreds of people were injured and 27 died in the worst violence since Mubarak left office. Abd El-Fattah refused to recognise the legitimacy of his interrogators or answer their questions and was then to be held for 15 days, a period that indefinitely renewable. He was accused of having incited fighting in Maspero, of assaulting soldiers and damaging military property. As in his 2006 imprisonment, his mother spoke out in his support, and initiated a hunger strike in opposition to the court-martialling of civilians on 6 November. His father and sisters also participated in the 2011 protests. At his first hearing, Abd El-Fattah's father, the human rights attorney Ahmed Seif El-Islam presented the military court with video tapes, one of which contained footage of Armored Personnel Carriers running over protesters and another of state television anchors "inciting violence." He also accused the head of military police of being directly responsible for the violence and accused the Supreme Council of Armed Forces of obstruction of justice for instituting a curfew the night of the attack in order to "hide all the evidence of the army's crimes."

The spokesman for the United Nations High Commissioner for Human Rights called for the release of Abd El-Fattah and all others imprisoned for exercising free speech, while Amnesty International issued a condemnation of his imprisonment and accusing SCAF of involvement in the Maspero clashes. In reaction to his imprisonment, thousands of protesters took part in demonstrations in Cairo and Alexandria demanding Abd El-Fattah's release. Human rights activists and bloggers outside of Egypt have also called for his release. While incarcerated in the Bab al-Khalq Prison, he wrote a letter to fellow Egyptian activists, claiming that SCAF had "hijacked" the revolution. He also compared his current imprisonment with the jail time he served in 2006, saying "I never expected to repeat the experience of five years ago. After a revolution that deposed the tyrant, I go back to his jails?"

Following protests against Abd El-Fattah's incarceration, military authorities allowed his case to be handled by a civilian court instead of military tribunal. On 13 December, the court dropped two charges against him, including incitement and illegal assembly. The court extended his detention for another 15 days and maintained the charges of stealing weapons and shooting at soldiers. While Abd El-Fattah remained in custody, his son Khaled was born, named after Khaled Said, the slain blogger who had become a symbol of the Egyptian revolution.

On 25 December 2011, a judge representing the public prosecutor's office ordered the release of Abd El-Fattah to take place the following day. He remained under a travel ban.

November 2013 arrest
In November 2013, Abd El-Fattah was arrested again for allegedly encouraging a demonstration against the new constitution outside the Egyptian Parliament. 20 policemen raided Abd El-Fattah's home, broke the door down, and proceeded to confiscate the family's computers and mobile phones. When Abd El-Fattah asked to see the arrest warrant, the police physically assaulted him and his wife.

September 2014 prize nomination
In September 2014, he was nominated by European United Left–Nordic Green Left for the Sakharov Prize, along with the Tunisian rapper Weld El 15 and the Moroccan rapper L7a9d. The following month, the nomination was withdrawn after controversy over some 2012 tweets by Abd El-Fattah at the time of Israel's bombing of Gaza. He complained that the tweets had been taken out of context.

February 2015 sentencing
On 23 February 2015, Abd El-Fattah was sentenced to five years in prison. He was released on 29 March 2019.

September 2019 re-arrest 
On the morning of 29 September 2019, during the 2019 Egyptian protests which Abd El-Fattah had not taken part in, Abd El-Fattah's family released a statement to announce that he was kidnapped after leaving the Dokki police station. Since his release in March 2019, Abd El-Fattah had been required to follow daily police probation of 12 hours per day in the Dokki police station for five years. Later on 29 September, Abd El-Fattah's sister Mona Seif declared that he had been arrested by the State Security Prosecution and that Abd El-Fattah's family didn't know what he was charged with. He was tortured by a welcome parade in Tora Prison.

December 2021 sentencing 
Alaa Abd El-Fattah was sentenced to five years of imprisonment for spreading "false news undermining national security" in December 2021, while lawyers Mohamed El-Baqer and blogger Mohamed “Oxygen” Ibrahim were sentenced to four years each, according to Abdel Fattah's sister Mona Seif. During his detention, at Tora Prison, he became a British citizen, through his British-born mother. On 2 April 2022, he began a hunger strike in protest at being kept in solitary confinement, and refused access to books, and the opportunity to exercise; demanding to be allowed a visit by United Kingdom Consular staff. As of 2 May, his hunger strike continued, he had received no medical attention despite losing weight and becoming "very weak", and had said his farewells to his family.

On 18 May 2022, 10 MPs and 17 members of the House of Lords urged the UK government to take action to help Alaa Abd El-Fattah. In a letter to foreign secretary Liz Truss, they stated that the British-Egyptian activist was being held in "inhumane" conditions. It also mentioned that the British embassy has been requesting consular access to Alaa, but it was denied by the Egyptian authorities. Lord Simon McDonald, former Permanent Under-Secretary of State for Foreign Affairs and Head of the Diplomatic Service, said that because of the international law on multiple citizenship Egypt does not have to recognise his British citizenship while he is in Egypt, where he holds citizenship.

On 14 June 2022, at least 25 celebrities and political thinkers from across the world urged the British foreign secretary Liz Truss to help secure the release of Alaa Abd el-Fattah. Mark Ruffalo, Dame Judi Dench, Stephen Fry and Carey Mulligan were among the celebrities who penned the letter calling on the United Kingdom to condemn the British-Egyptian activist's prolonged detention in Egypt. As of 14 June, Alaa’s hunger strike continued, and his family feared that he may die after weeks on just water and rehydration salts. Alaa’s sister, Sanaa Seif, also urged Liz Truss to publicly demand that the activist is saved from death by being released, as he was convinced that he won’t leave the Egyptian prison alive.

On 6 November 2022, as Egypt hosted world leaders for the COP27 summit, Abdel Fattah stopped drinking water, after more than six months of a hunger strike. His sister Sanaa Seif raised concerns that he might die within days. She said she “hopes and trusts” that PM Rishi Sunak would secure Abdel Fattah’s release during his visit to Egypt for COP27. Seif also spoke about her fears that the Egyptian authorities may be torturing Abdel Fattah and force-feeding him behind the closed doors. She asked for a proof of life of her brother. The UN human rights chief Volker Türk also called on Egypt to immediately release Alaa Abdel Fattah, stating that his life was “at acute risk”. On 10 November, prison officials told Abdel Fattah's family he had received "medical intervention with the knowledge of a judicial authority," indicative of either force-feeding or intravenous rehydration. On 15 November, his family received a letter from him saying he had ended his hunger strike and he would explain why at their next visit.

On 23 November 2022, 67 European parliamentarians called on European authorities and governments, to intervene for Alaa’s immediate release, and to transport him on a European plane to a country of his choice, due to the deterioration of his health in Egyptian prison and the possibility of his re-arrest.

Bibliography

See also
Asmaa Mahfouz
George Ishak
Wael Ghonim
Hossam el-Hamalawy

References

External links

 Alaa Abd El-Fatah Twitter account

1981 births
Living people
Democracy activists from Cairo
Egyptian bloggers
Egyptian dissidents
Egyptian revolutionaries
Human rights activists from Cairo
Political prisoners in Egypt